(formerly Aster pilosus) is a perennial, herbaceous, flowering plant in the Asteraceae family native to central and eastern North America.

Description
Its flowers have white ray florets and yellow disk florets.

Chromosomes
 has a monoploid number (also called base number) of eight chromosomes  There are plants of  pilosum with four and six sets of the chromosomes, tetraploid with 32 total and hexaploid with 48 total. These cytotypes occur regularly, with occasional pentaploids (five sets) that have 40 in total. The involucre and floret sizes are different between the tetraploids and hexaploids, and the latter are found primarily in formerly glaciated habitats.  pringlei is hexaploid with a total chromosome count of 48.

Taxonomy

Classification
Symphyotrichum pilosum is classified in subgenus Symphyotrichum section Symphyotrichum subsection Porteriani. This subsection contains four species in addition to : S.depauperatum (serpentine aster), S.kentuckiense (Kentucky aster), S.parviceps (smallhead aster), and S.porteri (Porter's aster). Two commonalities among the five species are their revolute phyllaries and their summer- and fall-forming basal leaf rosettes.

Varieties

Two varieties are accepted by Plants of the World Online (POWO). Determining the best taxonomy for this group has been difficult due to polyploidy and hybridization. The two currently recognized varieties are
  pilosum (autonym), with hairy stems and leaves, widespread, and often weedy; and,
  pringlei, commonly called  and named for American botanist Cyrus Guernsey Pringle.

Hybridization
Additionally, it has been determined that pollination has occurred between the two varieties or between the tetraploid and hexaploid cytotypes of  pilosum based on the discovery of pentaploids of that variety.

Distribution and habitat

Distribution

Native
Symphyotrichum pilosum var. pilosum is native to and widespread in central and eastern Canada and the United States.  pringlei is an east-central and northeastern North American variety, native to the area encompassing Minnesota in the northwest to Québec in the northeast, south to Georgia, west to Arkansas, northeast to Illinois, and north to Wisconsin.

Introduced
 pilosum is reported as an introduced species in the Canadian provinces of British Columbia, New Brunswick, Nova Scotia, and Prince Edward Island; and, in the countries of Belgium, France, Germany, Great Britain, India, Italy, Korea, Netherlands, and Spain. , it was not on the European Union's List of invasive alien species of Union concern.

Habitat
 pilosum is tolerant of harsh growing conditions. The natural habitats most often are in disturbed areas such as fallow or old fields, roadsides, salted roadsides, railroads, pastures, landfills, and quarries. The variety occurs less frequently in natural prairies, open deciduous woods, limestone outcrops, and, very uncommonly, wetlands.

It can be found among native flowering plants such as Solidago canadensis (Canada goldenrod), Solidago altissima (tall goldenrod), Achillea millefolium (common yarrow), Asclepias syriaca (common milkweed), Erigeron annuus (daisy fleabane), Ambrosia artemisiifolia (common ragweed), and Ambrosia trifida (giant ragweed). It co-occurs with weedy introduced species, including Cirsium arvense (creeping thistle), Chenopodium album (lamb's quarters), Rumex crispus (curly dock), Daucus carota (Queen Anne's lace), Securigera varia (crownvetch), Lactuca serriola (prickly lettuce), Melilotus albus (white sweetclover), Melilotus officinalis (sweet yellow clover), and Pastinaca sativa (parsnip). Non-native grasses found with it include Bromus inermis (smooth bromegrass), Poa compressa (Canada bluegrass), Poa pratensis (Kentucky bluegrass), and Schedonorus arundinaceus (tall fescue). On salted roadsides, it occurs with Symphyotrichum subulatum (eastern annual saltmarsh aster).

 pringlei is found on calcareous soils, sandy areas, limestone alvars, and shale outcrops.

Conservation
NatureServe lists the species and its varieties with various conservation statuses, and some states and provinces within range do not have statuses. ,  was listed as Globally Secure (G5); and, State Secure (S5) in Ontario, Delaware, Georgia, Iowa, Mississippi, New York, North Carolina, Virginia, and West Virginia.

 pilosum was listed as a Globally Secure Variety (T5); Secure (S5) in Ontario, Delaware, Georgia, New Jersey, New York, Virginia, and West Virginia; and, Vulnerable (S3) in Québec and Minnesota.  pringlei also was listed as a Globally Secure Variety (T5); Secure (S5) in Delaware, New Jersey, and Virginia; Apparently Secure (S4) in Ontario and New York; Vulnerable (S3) in Minnesota; Imperiled (S2) in Québec and West Virginia; and, Critically Imperiled (S1) in Arkansas. The global statuses were last reviewed in 2016.

Cultivation
Symphyotrichum pilosum var. pringlei and its cultivar 'Ochtendgloren' have both won the Royal Horticultural Society's Award of Garden Merit.

Citations

References

pilosum
Flora of the Eastern United States
Flora of Canada
Plants described in 1803
Taxa named by Carl Ludwig Willdenow